Mazhar Germen (1887, Aydın – 6 November 1967) was a Turkish physician, social democratic politician and women's rights activist. He is most notable for supporting the proclamation of the Women's People Party in the 1920s.

Biography
He was born in Aydın in 1887.

He graduated from medical school and was the chief doctor of Eskişehir Military Hospital. He was elected as a member of the parliament in Aydın for eight consecutive years.  In the first eight years, he was a deputy; he was a physician and politician who had served as the Deputy Governor of the health and social affairs (Ministry of Health and Social Welfare) in the 3rd government (1st Ali Fethi Okyar Government). He died on 6 November 1967.

References 

1887 births
1967 deaths
People from Aydın
Republican People's Party (Turkey) politicians
Place of death missing
20th-century Turkish physicians
Turkish women's rights activists